Lil B.I.G. Pac is the fourth mixtape by American rapper Kodak Black. It was released on June 11, 2016, by Dollaz N Dealz Entertainment and Sniper Gang. The mixtape features guest appearances from rappers  Gucci Mane, Boosie Badazz and PnB Rock.

Artwork
The cover art for Lil B.I.G. Pac features Kodak Black portrayed as a toddler, adapted from album cover of rapper The Notorious B.I.G.’s debut studio album Ready to Die, with a baby bottle said to contain Purple drank and a bandana tied around his head like American rapper Tupac.

Critical reception

Lil B.I.G. Pac received positive reviews from critics. At Metacritic, which assigns a normalized rating out of 100 to reviews from mainstream publications, the album received an average score of 64, based on 6 reviews.

Track listing

Charts

References

2016 mixtape albums
Albums produced by Honorable C.N.O.T.E.
Kodak Black albums